Asociația Club de Fotbal Gloria Bistrița, commonly known as Gloria Bistrița, or simply as Gloria, was a Romanian professional football club based in Bistrița, Bistrița-Năsăud County founded on 6 July 1922 and dissolved in 2015.

History

The club was founded on 6 July 1922 and among the founding staff members there were: Simion Sbârcea as the club's president; Teofil Moldovan as the club's secretary; Ion Bota; Dumitru Hara; Simion Pop; Ioan Archiudean; and others as the club's administration committee members.

Throughout its earlier history, the club had several other names: Ceramica Bistrița (before World War II), CS Bistrița (after World War II) and Progresul Bistrița until 1956, when the old name, Gloria, was readopted.

In 1954, the team participated in the Liga II promotion playoffs but missed on the promotion, in spite of the fact that, at that time, Gloria had on its team future Romania national team players, the Munteanu brothers.

Divizia C
The club played in Divizia C (now Liga III) three times. It was promoted for the first time in 1957, then for the second time in the 1963. Gloria played in Divizia C for a third and final time during the 1974–75 season, following a short-lived relegation from Divizia B.

Divizia B
Gloria earned its first Divizia B (now Liga II) promotion in 1958, just one year after they had promoted to Divizia C. They were promoted for a second time to B in 1970, under coach Titi Popescu, and, after the one-year relegation during the 1974–75 season, they finally were promoted for the 3rd time under Gheorghe Nuțescu's reign. The team then played in Divizia B for 15 years, between 1975 and 1990, possessing many valuable players, like Daniel Iftodi, Gheorghe Hurloi, Victor Ciocan, and others.

Promotion in top division and European cups

Gloria earned promotion to the Romanian top league, Divizia A (now Liga I), in 1990 under coach Remus Vlad, and then the team played at that level without interruption until 2011. During this time, the club also gave Romanian football remarkable players such as Viorel Moldovan, Gavril Balint, Lucian Sânmărtean, Ciprian Tătărușanu, Emilian Dolha, Cristian Coroian, and others. After beginning somewhat shyly in the top division, in 1993 Gloria finished in fifth place and managed to achieve their premiere qualification for a European international competition, the UEFA Cup. They drew 0–0 with Maribor at home, but were eliminated after a 2–0 defeat on the road in the second leg. In 1994, Gloria Bistrița won the Romanian Cup after defeating Universitatea Craiova by a score of 1–0. Despite finishing in seventh place, thanks to their cup final win, Gloria qualified for the UEFA Cup Winners' Cup. They beat the future UEFA Cup Winners' Cup winners Real Zaragoza 2–1 in Bistrița, but were eliminated after losing 4–0 at the Estadio La Romareda. After an absence of one season, although having finished in 12th place, Gloria returned to the UEFA Cup Winners' Cup after losing 3–1 in the final of the Romanian Cup against league champions Steaua București. They qualified past the inaugural round after defeating Valletta FC by scores of 2–1 in both legs. In the first round proper, Gloria drew 1–1 in Bistrița against Italian giants Fiorentina, but were eliminated by losing 1–0 in Florence.

In 1997, Gloria made its debut in the UEFA Intertoto Cup. At the group stage, playing in group 10, they finished in fourth place (out of 5 teams), having lost against Montpellier (1–2), Čukarički Stankom (3-2) and Groningen (4–1) and having won against Spartak Varna (2–1). In 2000, Gloria won Cupa Ligii, 3–1 on penalties, after having drawn 2–2 after extra time against FCM Bacau. They then failed to qualify for the second round of the 2001 Intertoto Cup after losing 1-0 to Jazz Pori in Finland and winning 2–1 in Bistrița. In 2002, Gloria qualified for the third round for the first time after eliminating Union Luxembourg (2–1 in Bistrița and 0–0 in Luxembourg) and Teuta Durrës (3–0 in Bistrița and 0–1 in Albania), but were eliminated by Lille (2–0 in both legs). In 2003, Gloria Bistrița finished the league season tied on points with FC Brasov in third place, the club's best ever performance, and qualified for the second round of the Intertoto Cup after eliminating Bangor City (0–1 in Wales and 5–2 in Bistrița), but the team was eventually eliminated by Brescia (1–2 in Italy and 1–1 in Bistrița).

In 2005, Gloria earned its best European results ever against Olympiakos Nicosia: 5-0 in Cyprus (its best away European victory) and 11–0 in Bistrița (its best home European victory). In 2007, Gloria finished its business with European competitions. In the 2007 Intertoto Cup, they eliminated OFK Grbalj (2–1 in Bistrița and 1–1 in Montenegro) and Maccabi Haifa (2–0 in Bistrița and 0–2 in Israel, 3–2 on penalties), but then lost the Cup final match (in the Southern-Mediterranean region) against Atlético Madrid. Even though they beat Atlético, 2-1 in Bistrița, they lost 1–0  in Madrid, and so, 2–2 on aggregate, the Spanish prevailed on the away goals rule.

After 2007, Gloria changed its objective, from European competitions to avoiding relegation. In 2011, Gloria was relegated in Liga II after failing to achieve a license for the next season.

Insolvency
Gloria's funding problems worsened. However, Gloria Bistrița resisted on the pitch, and finished runner-up in the second division, thereby earning promotion to Liga I once again, under the leadership of coach Nicolae Manea. In the following season, however, Gloria had the worst record in first division, finishing 18th, and were relegated yet again. After the second relegation, Manea left the club to coach Corona Brașov, taking with him former Gloria strikers, Cristian Coroian and Sandu Negrean, as technical director and head coach respectively, with the stated objective of gaining promotion.

On 25 July 2014, Gloria was relegated to Liga III, due to many financial problems, and changed its name from ACF Gloria 1922 Bistrița to Gloria Progresul Bistrița.

On 3 August 2015, the club was relegated to Liga V, due to many financial problems, and went bankrupt.

Successors

After the bankruptcy of ACF Gloria 1922 Bistriţa, a new club was formed, AF Gloria Bistrița, also known as Academia Gloria, club that wanted to continue the football tradition of Gloria and had also a short term rivalry with FC Bistrița, another team that wanted to fight for the supremacy in the town. Eventually FC Bistrița won the battle and promoted to Liga III, but due to lack of funds the team retired in the second part of the season and dissolved soon after. The death of the one who led Gloria for decades, Jean Pădureanu, seemed to be the last hammer blow for the football in Bistrița. Academia Gloria was a disputed project from its beginning, the new logo that depicted an ostrich with a ball at its feet has long been challenged by both media and supporters. Even if the team managed to promote from Liga V to Liga IV in its first year, has been stuck to this level for next two. The lack of results, the lack of interest in getting the ACF Gloria 1922 Bistriţa brand (to become the official successor) and the lack of professionalism at the level of management have removed both supporters and local authorities from this team, which was finally dissolved in the summer of 2018.

In the summer of 2018 when it seemed the situation had already a note of apathy and resignation, ACS Dumitra, a multiple champion of the Bistrița-Năsăud County and also the champion of the last season, announced that it changed its name to 1. FC Gloria Bistrița. The new president of the club was named Ioan Horoba, who was also the sporting director of ACF Gloria 1922 Bistriţa, in Pădureanu's era. In the squad were found players who have been successful with the old club such as: Sergiu Costin, Alin Chibulcutean, Sergiu Mândrean or Adrian Nalați.Founded on 31 May 2018 under the name of 1. FC Gloria, the team is considered as the unofficial successor of ACF Gloria Bistrița, both by supporters, the media, but also the club itself assuming this status. The team has a similar name, same colors (white and blue), is playing on the same stadium, also having former directors, managers and players of the old club involved in the destiny of the new entity. 1. FC Gloria also announced that in the future would like to buy ACF Gloria 1922 Bistriţa brand and to become its official successor.

Stadium

The stadium was inaugurated in 1930 and modernized in 2008. It was called Stadionul Municipal Gloria, before being named after the most important person in the club's history, Jean Pădureanu. The stadium has a total capacity of 7,800 seats.

European record

Statistics by competition

UEFA Cup Winners' Cup / European Cup Winners' Cup

UEFA Europa League / UEFA Cup

UEFA Intertoto Cup

Managers

Managerial history dating from the past 20 years

  Remus Vlad (1990–92)
  Constantin Cârstea (1992–93)
  Remus Vlad (1994)
  Constantin Cârstea (1994–96)
  Remus Vlad (1996–97)
  Constantin Cârstea (1997–02)
  Remus Vlad (2002–04)
  Constantin Cârstea (2004–05)
  Ioan Sabău (July 2005 – June 2009)
  Sandu Tăbârcă (July 2009 – Oct 09)
  Florin Halagian (Oct 2009)
  Marian Pană (Oct 2009 – Dec 09)
  Marius Șumudică (Jan 2010 – May 10)
  Laurențiu Reghecampf (June 2010 – Oct 10)
  Nicolae Manea (Oct 2010 – June 2013)
  Sandu Negrean & Cristian Coroian (June 2013 – June 2014)
  Valer Săsărman & Dorel Zegrean (June 2014 – August 2015)

Club honors

Domestic

Championships
Liga I
Best finish 3rd 2002–03
Liga II
Winners (1): 1989–90
Runners-up (8): 1976–77, 1978–79, 1980–81, 1981–82, 1983–84, 1984–85, 1987–88, 2011–12
Liga III
Winners (3): 1957–58, 1969–70, 1974–75
Runners-up (1): 1964–65
Cluj Regional Championship
Winners (1): 1962–63

Cups
Cupa României
Winners (1): 1993–94
Runners-up (1): 1995–96
Cupa Ligii
Winners (1): 2000
Supercupa României
Runners-up (1): 1994

European
UEFA Intertoto Cup
Runners-up (1): 2007

Club records in Liga 1

Club records in Liga 1 dating from the past 20 years

Longest winning run

 5 matches, June 10, 1995 – August 19, 1995

Longest unbeaten run
 7 matches, March 22, 1997 – May 3, 1997

Biggest wins
 5–0 against Rapid București, 1990–91 season
 5–0 against Jiul Petroșani, 1990–91 season
 5–0 against Sportul Studențesc, 1993–94 season
 6–1 against FC Maramureș, 1994–95 season
 5–0 against Oțelul Galați, 1996–97 season
 0–5 against Jiul Petroșani, 1997–98 season
 5–0 against Foresta Suceava, 1998–99 season
 6–1 against Unirea Alba Iulia, 2004–05 season
 5–0 against Politehnica Iași, 2009–10 season

Biggest losses
 0–6 against Progresul București, 1994–95 season
 0–6 against UTA Arad, 2002–03 season
 0–6 against Brașov, 2009–10 season

Most played games
 Victor Ciocan – over 600

Most goals
 Victor Ciocan – 426

References

External links

 
Association football clubs established in 1922
Association football clubs disestablished in 2015
Defunct football clubs in Romania
Football clubs in Bistrița-Năsăud County
Sport in Bistrița
Liga I clubs
Liga II clubs
Liga III clubs
1922 establishments in Romania
2015 disestablishments in Romania